South East European University (SEEU), informally also known as the Max van der Stoel University, is an internationally recognized private-public nonprofit higher education institution established in 2001 upon initiative of former Minister of Foreign Affairs of the Netherlands and OSCE High Commissioner on National Minorities HE Max van der Stoel and is located in Tetovo, North Macedonia with a branch campus in Skopje.

Since its establishment the university has succeeded in combining the best of European and U.S. experience and has continued to benefit from countless academic collaborations sponsored by the European Commission and USAID, among other donors.

During the opening ceremony former Swedish diplomat HE Rolf Ekéus stated: "Today is a good day for Europe. At a time when good news is in short supply, it is heartening to see that progress can be made towards building peace among people. […] In the future, people will think of Tetovo as the site of a [renowned] multi-lingual university".

The university is an associate member of the European University Association and the Balkan Universities Network.

Project initiation, funding and supervision 
The praise for the establishment of the South East European University (SEEU) has been given to former Dutch diplomat HE Max van der Stoel who initiated the venture of launching a globally recognized university and higher education excellence center with a European orientation in the region since the late 1990s.

Max van der Stoel, who has also been the first Chairman of the University's International Advisory Board, stressed the European orientation of the University by saying: "We know the wish of the population of the former Yugoslav Republic of Macedonia to have increasingly close relations with countries of the European Union and to have education at a standard recognized by European academic institutions".

Funds for the project were sought from the international community, while the local government provided the land where the university is situated.

The running of the project has been overseen since its beginning by both an international and a national advisory board.

Faculties and study programmes
South East European University (SEEU) offers courses and programmes leading to internationally recognized higher education degrees at bachelor, master and doctorate levels in several areas of study.

Study programmes are offered in three languages: English, Albanian and Macedonian.

The university is constituted of six faculties:

 Law 
 Contemporary Social Sciences
 Business and Economics
 Languages, Cultures and Communications
 Contemporary Sciences and Technologies
 Health Sciences

Rankings 
The university ranks regularly among the top higher education institutions in Europe.

Professors, lecturers and fellows 
Since its founding the university has had among its ranks countless prominent visiting and permanent international professors, lecturers and fellows alongside the local academic staff.

Students and alumni 
The university has a considerable number of international students and alumni and participates to different global academic exchange initiatives such as the Erasmus Programme.

Admissions 
South East European University (SEEU) has a selective admission policy based on students' previous academic record and grades.

University Board 
The University Board is currently composed of a total of seven members:

Klaus Tochtermann
Veli Kreci
Elena Dumova-Jovanoska
Nebi Hoxha
John Parrish - Sprowel
Visar Shehu
Veronika Kareva

References

Educational institutions established in 2001
South East European University
Tetovo
2001 establishments in the Republic of Macedonia